Dayna Lynn Polehanki is a Democratic member of the Michigan Senate, representing the 5th district since 2023. She previously represented the 7th district, from 2019 to 2022.

Polehanki has almost 19 years of experience as a teacher and was named Teacher of the Year in 2018.

References

External links 
 Official Website

Living people
Schoolteachers from Michigan
American women educators
Central Michigan University alumni
Alma College alumni
Marygrove College alumni
Democratic Party Michigan state senators
Women state legislators in Michigan
21st-century American politicians
21st-century American women politicians
Year of birth missing (living people)